SS Kurtuluş was a Turkish cargo ship which became famous for her humanitarian role in carrying food aid during the famine Greece suffered under the Axis occupation in World War II. She sank on 20 February 1942 in the Sea of Marmara during her fifth voyage from İstanbul, Turkey to Piraeus, Greece. In Turkish, “kurtuluş” means "liberation".

History of the ship

The steamer Kurtuluş was built by Caird & Purdie Shipyard in Barrow-in-Furness, Cumbria, England in 1883. After having served under different flags and names, she was purchased in 1924 by the prominent Turkish shipowning family, Kalkavan brothers. 

She served as freighter in Turkish waters as one of the first ships under the flag of the newly established Turkish Republic. She was re-sold in 1934 to another family active in the same field, Tavilzade brothers, who named her "SS Kurtuluş" ("SS Liberation") in 1934. In 1941, SS Kurtuluş was leased by the Turkish government for humanitarian relief to be provided during the food crisis in Greece.

The mission & aftermath
Greece experienced the Great Famine during the time the country was occupied by Nazi Germany starting April 1941, as well as a sea blockade by the Royal Navy at the same time. The famine today is generally believed to have caused the deaths of around 300,000 people of all ages, according to historian and researcher Mark Mazower. And at the time, about 70,000 people according to the Nazi officials and sources during the period in Axis occupied-Greece. 

The National Greek War Relief Association, an organization formed in October 1940 by the Greek Orthodox Church, started to raise funds in the United States and to organize relief efforts to supply the population with food and medicine. The Allied high command were initially reluctant to lift the blockade since it was the only form of pressure they had on the Axis Powers. However, a compromise was reached to allow shipments of grain to come from the neutral Turkey, despite the fact that it was within the blockade zone.

Turkish president İsmet İnönü with the Turkish parliament and his government, signed a decision and initiated a mission to help the people whose army he had personally clashed & fought with during the Turkish War of Independence 19 years prior. Turkey thus became the first to lend a helping hand to Greece officially, with a significant amount of support from several other organizations. Foodstuffs were collected by a nationwide campaign of Kızılay (Turkish Red Crescent) and the operation was mainly funded by the American Greek War Relief Association and the Hellenic Union of Constantinopolitans. Food supplies were sent to the port of Istanbul to be shipped to Greece. SS Kurtuluş was prepared for her voyage with big symbols of the Red Crescent painted on both sides.

After having received permission from London to cross the blockade zone, the ship left Karaköy Pier on 6 October 1941 for the first time. Upon landing in Piraeus, the port city near Athens, the International Red Cross took charge of unloading and of distributing the foodstuffs. In the following months, SS Kurtuluş made three more voyages to Greece delivering a total of 6,735 tons of food aid.

Sinking & fate

During her fifth voyage, after having left Istanbul on 18 February, the old ship was caught in heavy weather and rough seas in the Sea of Marmara. During the stormy night of 20 February 1942, SS Kurtuluş was blown onto rocks off the coast near Saraylar village, north of Marmara Island. She sank the next morning at 9:15 after the accident. All 34 crew members reached Marmara Island. The place was later named Cape Kurtuluş in her memory.

Despite the loss of SS Kurtuluş, Turkey maintained her determination to help, and continued sending aid until 1946 with other ships like SS Dumlupınar, SS Tunç, SS Konya, SS Güneysu and SS Aksu.  One ship, the SS Dumlupınar brought around 1,000 sick Greek children aged 13–16 to İstanbul to recuperate in a safe place.

The documentary film
Turkish writer-researcher & film director Erhan Cerrahoğlu undertook research work to produce a documentary on SS Kurtuluş and on the relief campaign the ship was part of. The wrecksite was identified in summer 2005, by diver Professor Erdoğan Okuş and his team. The shipwreck was found mostly demolished, and many of the wreckage parts were scattered across the sea-floor.

The documentary film Barışı Taşıyan Vapur: Kurtuluş (SS Kurtuluş: The Steamship That Carried Peace) features images seen for the first time. The documentary debuted on 1 June 2006, during the 3rd International Istanbul Bunker Conference.

Footnotes

References

 
 
 A History of Greece

Sources
Dimitri Kitsikis, «La famine en Grèce, 1941 1942. Les conséquences politiques»,Revue d'Histoire de la Deuxième Guerre mondiale (Paris), 19th year, no. 74, April 1969.

 limited preview 

Ships built in Barrow-in-Furness
Cargo ships of Turkey
Greece–Turkey relations
Greece in World War II
Shipwrecks in the Sea of Marmara
Maritime incidents in February 1942
Maritime incidents in Turkey
1942 in Turkey
1883 ships
Steamships of Turkey